In Hinduism, upachara (Sanskrit: उपचार; service or courtesy) refers to the offerings and services made to a deity as part of worship.

List
Krishnananda Agamavagisha states in the Brihat Tantrasara that the main worship is conducted with 5, 10, 16 or 18 articles. These are

Panchopachara
This is the most basic mode. It includes
Gandha : Fragrant items like agarwood, musk & sandalwood
Pushpa : Flowers & leaves
Dhupa : Incense
Dipa: offering of lamps/ light
Naivedya : Food consisting of uncooked(like fruits & milk) & cooked(like payasam, boiled rice, vegetables, curry & dal) dishes

Dashopachara 
Alongside the 5 articles mentioned above, it also includes 5 additional items which are 
Padya : Water for washing feet
Arghya : An offering consisting of water, durva, flowers & raw rice grains given in the hands of a guest in ancient times as a sign of reception & respect
Achamaniya : Water for rinsing lips for achamana
Madhuparka : An offering of honey mixed with curd, ghee, milk & sugar in specific quantities given before starting any ceremony as a sign of reception 
Punarachamaniya : Water for achamana to be offered after giving madhuparka

Shodashopachara
This is most prevalent mode. Apart from the articles mentioned in the previous list (except Madhuparka), it includes 7 additional items which are 
Snaniya : Water offered for bathing
Vastra : New, unstitched, clean, unused clothes for wearing. For male deities, it is dhoti & uttariya while for female deities it is sari.
 Alamkara :  Traditional jewellery
Tambula : Offering of paan after naivedya
Tarpana : Offering libations of water for satisfaction of disembodied & divine beings. In practice it is substituted with offerings of drinks like drinking water & sharbat alongside naivedya. 
Stotra : Recitation of hymns & eulogies of the deity who is worshipped. 
Namaskara : Bowing down or prostrating before the deity with folded hands in reverence.

Astadashopachara
It includes all articles mentioned  in the previous list except Punarachamaniya, Tambula & Stotra, it includes 5 additional items which are 
Asana : Offering a seat in the form of a mat for sitting on ground or low stool made of wood or metals like gold & silver. 
Svagata : Greetings of reception given by the host(the priest in this case) to the guest( the deity in this case). 
Malya : Garlands made of flowers & leaves.
Anulepana : Unguents like sandalwood for anointing the body.
Upavita : Offering sacred thread

Some texts include all abovementioned articles(without omitting any) alongside additional articles like shayya(bedding) & chhatra(umbrella). Additional items offered  in case of female deities include lac, collyrium & vermilion. Some deities are offered articles which aren't offered to other deities. For example, alcohol is offered to Kali.

References

Hindu worship